Notonykia is a genus of squid in the family Onychoteuthidae. The type species is Notonykia africanae.

References

External links
 Tree of Life web project: Notonykia

Squid